Spalerosophis diadema, known commonly as the diadem snake and the royal snake, is a species of large snake in the subfamily Colubrinae of the family Colubridae. The species is endemic to Asia and northern Africa.

Geographic range

S. diadema is found in Algeria, Afghanistan, Egypt, northern India, Iran, Iraq, Israel, Lebanon, Jordan, southern Kazakhstan, Kyrgyzstan, Libya, Mali, Mauritania, Morocco, Niger, Oman, United Arab Emirates, western Pakistan, Russia, Saudi Arabia, northern Sudan, Syria, Tajikistan, Tunisia, Turkey, southern Turkmenistan, and Uzbekistan.

Subspecies
Three subspecies of S. diadema are recognized as being valid, including the nominotypical subspecies, and are found as follows.
Spalerosophis diadema cliffordi  – from Morocco to Egypt and Israel (Type locality: Tripoli, Libya)
Spalerosophis diadema diadema  – India, Pakistan (Type locality: near "Bombay", India)
Spalerosophis diadema schiraziana  – Zagros Mountains and the region of Bushire in western Iran, eastwards to southern Turkmenistan into Afghanistan and India; Pakistan (Type locality: Shiraz, Iran)

Etymology
The subspecific name, cliffordi, is in honor of "M[onsieur]. Clifford Cocq van Breugel " who was Dutch consul at Tripoli, probably referring to Jacques Fabrice Herman Clifford Kocq van Breugel (1799-1867).

Description
S. diadema may attain a total length of 1.8 m (about 6 feet), of which about 34 cm (13½ inches) is tail. Dorsally, it is pale buff or sandy grey, with a median series of dark blotches, and smaller dark spots. Ventrally, it is usually uniform white, but rarely has small blackish spots.

Reproduction
S. diadema is oviparous.

References

Further reading
Jan G (1865). "Prime linee d'una fauna della Persia occidentale ". pp. 342–357. In: De Filippi F (1865). Note di un viaggio in Persia nel 1862. Milan: G. Daelli. 369 pp. (Periops parellellus var. schiraziana, new variety, p. 356). (in Italian).
Marx H (1959). "Review of the colubrid snake genus Spalerosophis ". Fieldiana Zoology 39: 347–361.
Schlegel H (1837). Essai sur la physionomie des serpens. Partie Générale. xxviii + 251 pp.  Partie Descriptive. 606 + xvi pp. Amsterdam: M.H. Schonekat. (Coluber diadema, new species, pp. 146–147 in Partie Générale  p. 148 in Partie Descriptive). (Coluber cliffordii, new species, pp. 148–149 in Partie Générale  pp. 163-164 + Plate VI, figures 13 & 14 in Partie Descriptive). (in French).
Schmidt KP (1930). "Reptiles of Marshall Field North Arabian Desert Expeditions, 1927–1928". Field Museum of Natural History Zoological Series 17 (6): 221-230 + Plate II. (Spalerosophis diadema, new combination, pp. 226–227).
Smith MA (1943). The Fauna of British India, Ceylon and Burma, Including the Whole of the Indo-Chinese Sub-region. Reptilia and Amphibia, Vol. III.—Serpentes. London: Secretary of State for India. (Taylor and Francis, printers). xii + 583 pp. (Coluber diadema, pp. 173–175).

External links
https://web.archive.org/web/20061213095046/http://itgmv1.fzk.de/www/itg/uetz/herp/photos/Spalerosophis_diadema.jpg 
https://web.archive.org/web/20061213094043/http://itgmv1.fzk.de/www/itg/uetz/herp/photos/Spalerosophis_d_atriceps.jpg

Spalerosophis
Reptiles of Pakistan
Taxa named by Hermann Schlegel
Reptiles described in 1837

Snakes of Jordan